The East Los Angeles Cobras were an American soccer team that played in East Los Angeles, California. They joined the USISL in 1993 and later became affiliated with the Los Angeles Salsa of the American Professional Soccer League. The Cobras moved to the USISL Pro League in 1995 and were temporarily renamed the Los Angeles Salsa U-23 as a replacement for the parent club.

Year-by-year

Coaches
 Octavio Zambrano: 1992–1994

References

Defunct soccer clubs in California
Soccer clubs in Los Angeles
Eastside Los Angeles
Los Angeles Salsa
USISL teams
1993 establishments in California
1995 disestablishments in California
Soccer clubs in California
Association football clubs established in 1993
Association football clubs disestablished in 1995